Captain Edward Johnson (1598–1672) was a leading figure in colonial Massachusetts, and is one of the founders of Woburn, Massachusetts.

Johnson probably came to America in the Winthrop Fleet in 1630.  He returned to England in 1636 or 1637 to bring his wife and children to America.  He was considered the "Father of Woburn,"  and served as its first town clerk (from 1640 until his death).  He was selected as Deputy from Woburn to the Massachusetts General Court (the colonial legislature) almost every year from 1646 on.  

Johnson was the first military officer commissioned in Woburn, and was one of the founders of the Ancient and Honorable Artillery Company of Massachusetts.  He served as an ensign in Cooke's Company in the Pequot War, served as lieutenant for the Middlesex County Troop in 1643, and was made captain in 1644.  He served as Surveyor General of the military stores of the colony in 1659.

Johnson is regarded as the author of the first printed history of New England, The Wonderworking Providence of Sion's Savior in New England, which was published in England in 1654.

Johnson was selected by the General Court to make the first map of Massachusetts.  He established the boundary between Massachusetts and New Hampshire, and also laid out the boundaries of Woburn and other towns.

References

External links
 Woburn Historical Society Web site
 Wonder-working Providence of Sions Saviour in New England

People from Woburn, Massachusetts
1598 births
1672 deaths
People of colonial Massachusetts
Kingdom of England emigrants to Massachusetts Bay Colony